Education in Kiribati is free and compulsory from age 6 to 14, which includes primary school through grade six, and Junior Secondary School for three additional grade levels. In 1998, the gross primary enrollment rate was 84.4 percent, and net primary enrollment rate was 70.7 percent. School quality and access to education are better in urban areas; schools in small communities on isolated islands are expensive to maintain. Mission schools are slowly being absorbed into the government primary school system.

There are primary schools on most of the inhabited islands. Secondary schools are located on some of the islands with students travelling to live at their school. For example, Abaiang, which is in the northern Gilbert Islands, has three secondary schools, in 2011 there were 212 students at the Ministry of Education school, Ueen Abaiang, which is located between the villages of Koinawa and Aonobuaka. A further 135 students are enrolled at St Joseph's College in Tabwiroa and 23 students at Steven Whitmee High School in Morikao, making 370 secondary school students in total. The two high schools at Morikao and Tabuiroa accommodate students from all over Kiribati who have passed the entrance examinations to get into the schools.

St. Joseph's College was founded in 1939. Its alumni include both current President Anote Tong, and previous incumbent Teburoro Tito.

There are primary schools and secondary schools operated by the Christian denominations including the Roman Catholic Church (such as St. Joseph's College) and the Church of Jesus Christ of Latter-day Saints, (such as Moroni High School in South Tarawa, of which Waitea Abiuta has been the headmaster).

The Kiribati Teacher College and King George V and  Elaine Bernacchi School, the Government High School, are in Bikenibeu in South Tarawa.

Higher education is expanding; students may seek technical, teacher or marine training, or study in other countries. To date, most choosing to do the latter have gone to Fiji to attend University of the South Pacific, and those wishing to complete medical training have been sent to Cuba.

The University of the South Pacific has a campus in Kiribati for distant/flexible learning, but also to provide preparatory studies towards obtaining certificates, diplomas and degrees at other campus sites.

The Human Rights Measurement Initiative (HRMI) finds that Kiribati is fulfilling only 90.6% of what it should be fulfilling for the right to education based on the country's level of income. HRMI breaks down the right to education by looking at the rights to both primary education and secondary education. While taking into consideration Kiribati's income level, the nation is achieving 94.4% of what should be possible based on its resources (income) for primary education but only 86.8% for secondary education.

Schools
Kiribati Ministry of Education is the education ministry. Kiribati has 94 elementary schools, 24 junior high schools, and 16 senior high schools. The government high schools are King George V and Elaine Bernacchi School, Tabiteuea North Senior Secondary School, and Melaengi Tabai Secondary School; Tabiteuea North, in Eita, is also known as Teabike College. Previously KGV/EBS was the sole government high school.

13 high schools are operated by Christian churches. They are:
 Abemama
 Chevalier School
 Kauma High School - Also has junior high school
 Abaiang
 St Joseph's College
 Stephen Whitmee High School
 Beru
 Hiram Bingham High School
 Kiritimati
 St. Francis High School
 Nonouti
 George Eastman High School
 North Tarawa
 Immaculate Heart College
 South Tarawa
 Church of God High School
 Moroni High School - Also has junior high school
 Sacred Heart High School
 St. Louis High School
 William Goward Memorial School

References

Further reading